Lionel  "Len" Richley (2 July 1924 – after 1970) was an English footballer who made 72 appearances in the Football League playing as a wing half for Hartlepools United in the 1950s. He went on to manage non-league clubs Holbeach United and King's Lynn and league clubs Rochdale and Darlington.

Managerial statistics
Source:

References

1924 births
Year of death missing
Footballers from Gateshead
English footballers
Association football wing halves
Tonbridge Angels F.C. players
Crystal Palace F.C. players
Hartlepool United F.C. players
Holbeach United F.C. players
English Football League players
English football managers
Holbeach United F.C. managers
King's Lynn F.C. managers
Rochdale A.F.C. managers
Darlington F.C. managers
English Football League managers